The 1986 Colgate Red Raiders football team was an American football team that represented Colgate University during the 1986 NCAA Division I-AA football season.  In the first year of play for the Colonial League, Colgate tied for last place. 

In its 11th season under head coach Frederick Dunlap, the team compiled a 4–7 record. Erik Rosenmeier and Scott Montross were the team captains. 

Colgate's 1–3 conference record tied for fourth in the five-team Colonial League standings. The Red Raiders outscored all opponents 312 to 274.

Colgate was No. 16 in the first week of Division I-AA national rankings, but dropped out of the top 20 in time for its second game, and remained unranked through the end of the season.

The team played its home games at Andy Kerr Stadium in Hamilton, New York.

Schedule

References

Colgate
Colgate Raiders football seasons
Colgate Red Raiders football